Drew Brazil Dalman (born October 15, 1998) is an American football center for the Atlanta Falcons of the National Football League (NFL). He played college football at Stanford.

College career
Dalman was ranked as a threestar recruit out of high school. He committed to Stanford, where his father went to play football, on August 30, 2016.
Dalman had other offers from Arizona, Colorado, Columbia, Fresno State, Idaho, Michigan, Nevada, Washington, Wyoming and Yale.
Dalman played 4 years at Stanford as a center. Dalman started 22-of-25 games (20 at center, two at guard) over four years for the Cardinal.
Dalman did not allow a single pressure as a senior, fortifying a Stanford offensive line that did not allow a sack all season in 2020.
Dalman earned first-team All-Pac 12 honors as a senior and was named team captain.
Dalman started all 12 games at center as a junior in 2019 and was named second-team All-Pac 12. Dalman was named to second-team 2020–2021 CoSIDA Academic All-America team after majoring in mechanical engineering and maintaining a 3.61 grade point average.

Professional career

Atlanta Falcons
Dalman was drafted by the Atlanta Falcons with the 114th pick in the fourth round of the 2021 NFL Draft. He signed his four-year rookie contract with Atlanta on June 17, 2021.

Personal life
Dalman is the son of former San Francisco 49ers player Chris Dalman.
Dalman also has a sister named Kate who is the operations and recruiting assistant for the Stanford football program.

References

Living people
Sportspeople from Salinas, California
Players of American football from California
American football centers
Stanford Cardinal football players
Atlanta Falcons players
1998 births